Chinchaysuyoa ortegai is a species of catfish in the family Ariidae. It is endemic to freshwater bodies in northern Peru. Specimens of this species were formerly classified as Hexanematichthys henni (now C. labiata) until they were found to actually represent a new species in the genus Chinchaysuyoa.

References

Ariidae
Fish described in 2019
Freshwater fish of Peru
Endemic fauna of Peru